Stany Coppet (born 22 June 1976) is a French actor.

Biography
In 2003, he left Paris for New York City where he studied acting, dancing and singing at the Lee Strasberg Theatre Institute. On stage in New York, he performed at the Repertory and the Century Center for the Performing Arts. Then, along with Steven Adams and Steven Soderbergh, he co-produced Roger Guenveur Smith's solo performance "Who Killed Bob Marley" at the Bootleg Theater in Los Angeles. 
Coppet is the creator of the show "From slavery to freedom (Speeches and poems on colonialism and slavery)" produced for the first time in French Guiana, then at the City Hall of Paris and for the U.S. Embassy in Paris. 
 
In 2010, Coppet was in the movie "Orpailleur" by Marc Barrat. The same year for the Spanish cinema in "Aguila Roja" (dir. Jose Ramon Ayerra, prod. Globomedia), Coppet played the part of Claude Acheron, El Mosquetero. 
In February 2010 he produced and starred alongside Dolores Chaplin, Kasi Lemmons and Vondie Curtis-Hall in his show "From Slavery to Freedom" at the Cantor Film Center in New York.
In 2011, in a France 2 biopic of Toussaint Louverture, Stany Coppet played the role of General André Rigaud.
In 2013, Coppet joined the cast of the Telecinco series El Príncipe, in the role of Khaled. 
Coppet also appeared in and co-wrote the film La Vie Pure directed by Jeremy Banster, based on the life of the French explorer Raymond Maufrais, who disappeared in the Amazon forest of French Guiana in 1950.

Partial filmography

Cinema 
 2014: La Vie Pure - Pure Life directed by Jeremy Banster
 2011: Águila Roja la Película directed by José Ramon Ayerra
 2010: Orpailleur directed by Marc Barrat
 2010: Mortem directed by Éric Atlan

Television 
 2018: Los nuestros, Telecinco
 2017: Perdóname, señor, Telecinco
 2014: El Príncipe, Telecinco
 2012: Toussaint Louverture directed by Philippe Niang
 2011: Death In Paradise directed by Roger Golby
 2011: Section de recherches directed by Jean Marc Thérin
 2011: Le Fabuleux Chevalier de Saint George directed by Claude Ribbe
 2009: The black Devil directed by Claude Ribbe

References

External links 
 
 www.stanycoppet.com

Year of birth missing (living people)
Living people
French people of French Guianan descent
French male film actors
French male television actors